Débil may refer to:

Debil, album by Die Ärzte 1984
Débil, single by Puerto Rican singer Mary Ann Acevedo